The James W. Hamer House is a historic home located near Little Rock, Dillon County, South Carolina. It was built in 1910–1911, and is a large two-story, three bay, brick-veneered Neo-Classical Revival style residence. It has four symmetrically placed exterior end brick chimneys.  The front facade features an Ionic order pedimented portico supported by two sets of paired brick columns.  Also located on the property are several agricultural outbuildings and a mature pecan orchard that was likely planted by about 1920.  It was the home of James Willis Hamer, farmer, state representative, and state senator of Dillon County during its first half-century.

It was listed on the National Register of Historic Places in 2007.

See also
Hamer Hall, also in Dillon County, is also listed on the NRHP

References

Houses on the National Register of Historic Places in South Carolina
Neoclassical architecture in South Carolina
Houses completed in 1911
Houses in Dillon County, South Carolina
National Register of Historic Places in Dillon County, South Carolina